Callinus (Kallinos; fl. mid-7th c. BC) was an ancient Greek elegiac poet who lived in the city of Ephesus in Asia Minor in the mid-7th century BC. His poetry is representative of the genre of martial exhortation elegy in which Tyrtaeus also specialized and which both Archilochus and Mimnermus appear to have composed. Along with these poets, all his near contemporaries, Callinus was considered the inventor of the elegiac couplet by some ancient critics.

He resided in Ephesus in Asia Minor. He is supposed to have flourished between the invasion of Asia Minor by the Cimmerians and their expulsion by Alyattes (630–560 BC). During his lifetime his own countrymen were also engaged in a life-and-death struggle with the Magnesians. These two events give the key to his poetry, in which he endeavours to rouse the indolent Ionians to a sense of patriotism.

Only a few fragments of the Callinus' poetry have survived. One of the longest fragments, consisting of 21 lines of verse, is a patriotic exhortation to his fellow Ephesians urging them to fight the invading Cimmerians, who were menacing the Greek colonies in Asia Minor:

Works of martial elegy such as this often allude to the language and the thematic content of Homer's Iliad. It is likely that Callinus performed his poetry at symposia.

Notes

Select bibliography
 .
 .
 .
 . — Text and commentary on select fragments.
 . — Critical edition of the Greek.
 . — Translation with facing Greek text.
 .
 .
 . — Critical edition of the Greek.
 .

External links
Translation of Callinus fr. 1 at Poetry Archive

Ancient Greek poets
Ancient Greek elegiac poets
Ancient Ephesians
7th-century BC Greek people
7th-century BC poets